Edmund Haviland-Burke (27 January 1836 – 17 June 1886) was a British  politician, Member of Parliament for Christchurch from 1868 to 1874.

He was only son of Thomas William Aston Haviland-Burke (1795–1852) and a great grandnephew of Edmund Burke. A son, Edmund Haviland-Burke, was Irish Parliamentary Party MP for Tullamore from 1900 to 1914.

He died in Dublin.

Notes

External links
Parliamentary Archives, Papers of Edmund Haviland Burke, Member of Parliament for Christchurch, Dorset, 1868-1874

1836 births
1886 deaths
Members of the Parliament of the United Kingdom for English constituencies
UK MPs 1868–1874